Arthur Lawrence Schallock (born April 25, 1924) is an American former left-handed pitcher who played with the New York Yankees and Baltimore Orioles from 1951 to 1955.

Early life
Art Schallock was born in 1924, the fourth child and second son of Arthur, a telephone/telegraph lineman, and Alice Schallock. He attended Tamalpais High School in Mill Valley, graduating in 1943. He was inducted into the Marin Athletic Foundation Hall of Fame in 1989.

Schallock was drafted in 1943 and served in the United States Navy (1943–1946) during World War II as a radio operator on the aircraft carrier USS Coral Sea, which was later renamed the USS Anzio (CVE-57).

Pro baseball career
He signed with the Brooklyn Dodgers in 1947 and spent four full seasons in their farm system before the Yankees acquired him from the Hollywood Stars of the Pacific Coast League in June 1951.

After getting off to a 9–3 start with the Kansas City Blues of the American Association in 1953, Schallock was called up by the Yankees on July 6 when Ewell Blackwell retired. Schallock appeared in 58 Major League games, including 14 assignments as a starting pitcher, and allowed 199 hits and 91 bases on balls in  innings of work, with 77 strikeouts. In the 1953 World Series, pitching against the team that initially signed him, the Dodgers, Schallock pitched in one game for two innings, allowing one earned run for a 4.50 earned run average, gave up two hits, struck out one, and walked one batter.

Following the death of George Elder on July 7, 2022, Schallock became the oldest living former major league baseball player.

References

External links 
 Art Schallock's Baseball Almanac Biography

1924 births
Living people
Baltimore Orioles players
Baseball players from California
College of Marin alumni
Hollywood Stars players
Kansas City Blues (baseball) players
Major League Baseball pitchers
Montreal Royals players
New York Yankees players
Oakland Oaks (baseball) players
People from Mill Valley, California
Pueblo Dodgers players
Seattle Rainiers players
Tamalpais High School alumni
United States Navy personnel of World War II
United States Navy sailors